Lars Pettersson is a Swedish sprint canoer who competed in the early 1950s. He won a gold medal in the K-4 1000 m event at the 1950 ICF Canoe Sprint World Championships in Copenhagen.

References

Living people
Swedish male canoeists
Year of birth missing (living people)
ICF Canoe Sprint World Championships medalists in kayak